Edward Weston (May 9, 1850 – August 20, 1936) was an English-born American chemist and engineer noted for his achievements in electroplating and his development of the electrochemical cell, named the Weston cell, for the voltage standard. Weston was a competitor of Thomas Edison in the early days of electricity generation and distribution.

Biography
Born in Oswestry, Shropshire, England, in 1850 to a merchant family, Weston originally studied medicine but soon became interested in chemistry. He emigrated to the United States after receiving his medical diploma in 1870, where he found a job in the electroplating industry. Realizing the need for a constant source of current, he developed an interest in power generation and invented several dynamos and generators. He eventually co-founded the Weston Electric Light Company in Newark, New Jersey and later won the contract to illuminate the Brooklyn Bridge. Weston was a founding member of the board of trustees of what later became the New Jersey Institute of Technology. Some of his inventions, instruments, and writings are maintained at the university's library and the Weston Museum Weston was president of the American Institute of Electrical Engineers from 1888-89.

He invented two alloys, constantan and manganin. Weston developed measurement instruments for electric current—the modern foundation for the voltmeter, ammeter and wattmeter. In 1888 he formed the Weston Electrical Instrument Corporation which would become famous for its voltmeters, ammeters, wattmeters, ohmmeters, frequency meters, transformers, and transducers. Weston developed a method for producing a "true" permanent magnet. Weston conceived of and built a magnetic speedometer. Weston also developed the dashboard ammeter for Harley-Davidson motorcycles. Also in 1888, Weston became president of the American Institute of Electrical Engineers (AIEE) until 1889.

Weston invented and patented the saturated cadmium cell in 1893. The cathode in the cell is an amalgam of cadmium with mercury, the anode is of pure mercury, and the electrolyte is a solution of cadmium sulphate. The Weston cell is a wet-chemical cell that produces a highly stable voltage suitable as a laboratory standard for calibration of voltmeters. The temperature coefficient was reduced by shifting to an unsaturated design, the predominant type today. When the Weston cell became the International Standard for EMF in 1911, Weston waived his patent rights.

Weston died in Montclair, New Jersey in 1936, having attained 334 United States patents during his life.

Patents  (selected list)

 
 
 
 
 
 , "Voltaic cell"

Weston's son Edward Faraday Weston (1878–1971) received several patents regarding exposure meters, also manufactured by the Weston Electrical Instrument Corporation and widely distributed since the 1930s, and established the system of the Weston film speed ratings for the measurement of film speeds.

See also
 Timeline of solar cells

References

Further reading
 Hospitalier, Édouard, et al., "Principales applications de l'électricité" (Tr. Principal applications of electricity; Modern applications of electricity). London : Kegan Paul, Trench & Co., 1882.
 Weston Electrical Instrument Corporation, "Measuring invisibles; the fifty-year record of the world's largest manufacturer of electrical measuring instruments". Newark, N.J., Weston Electrical Instrument Corporation, c1938. LCCN 40002525 (ed. Planned and written by F. Lawrence Babcock Associates, New York)
 Woodbury, David Oakes, "A measure for greatness; a short biography of Edward Weston". New York, McGraw-Hill, 1949. LCCN 49049451

External links 

 Katz, Eugenii, Edward Weston. Biosensors & Bioelectronics
 Edward Weston, Weston Instruments, Newark
 Martin Tipper, - The Company and The Man
 John D. de Vries, BIO: Edward Weston, 2000

1850 births
1936 deaths
Battery inventors
English electrical engineers
American electrical engineers
English chemists
20th-century American chemists
People from Montclair, New Jersey
People from Oswestry
English emigrants to the United States
Engineers from New Jersey
19th-century American chemists